This is a list of diseases of tobacco (Nicotiana tabacum).

Bacterial diseases

Fungal diseases

Nematodes, parasitic

Viral and phytoplasma diseases

Miscellaneous diseases and disorders

References 
 Common Names of Diseases, The American Phytopathological Society

Tobacco